San Isidro Palo Verde is a town in the municipality of San Martín de Hidalgo in the state of Jalisco, Mexico. It has a population of 341 inhabitants.

References

External links
San Isidro Palo Verde at PueblosAmerica.com

Populated places in Jalisco